Marta Tagliaferro (born 4 November 1989 in Noventa Vicentina, Italy) is an Italian former track and road racing cyclist, who rode professionally between 2009 and 2020 for the Gauss RDZ Ormu–Colnago,  and  teams. As a junior rider Tagliaferro won three Italian national titles in 2007: two on the track and one on the road. She became under-23 European champion in the points race at the 2009 European Track Championships.

Major results

2007
 National Junior Track Championships
1st  Points race
1st  Scratch
 1st  Road race, National Junior Road Championships
 3rd  Points race, UEC European Junior Track Championships
2008
 3rd  Team pursuit, 2008–09 UCI Track Cycling World Cup Classics, Cali
2009
 1st  Points race, UEC European Under-23 Track Championships
 9th Novilon Eurocup Ronde van Drenthe
2010
 2nd  Points race, UEC European Under-23 Track Championships
 5th Tour of Chongming Island World Cup
 6th Overall Tour of Chongming Island Stage race
 7th GP Liberazione
2011
 2nd Team pursuit, National Track Championships
2012
 3rd Overall Trophée d'Or Féminin
 9th GP de Plouay – Bretagne
2013
 National Track Championships
1st  Omnium
1st  Team pursuit
2nd Scratch
3rd Keirin
 3rd Classica Citta di Padova 
 3rd Scratch, Copa Internacional de Pista
 6th Tour of Chongming Island World Cup
 9th Overall Ladies Tour of Qatar
2014
 National Track Championships
1st  Team pursuit
2nd Scratch
 2nd Overall Tour of Zhoushan Island
 9th Overall Tour of Chongming Island
2015
 5th EPZ Omloop van Borsele
 6th Novilon EDR Cup
 9th Ronde van Drenthe World Cup
2016
 1st Stage 2 Tour Femenino de San Luis
 1st Stage 5 Gracia–Orlová
 6th Overall BeNe Ladies Tour
2019
 1st Omloop van de IJsseldelta
 1st Stage 1 Tour de Feminin-O cenu Českého Švýcarska
 6th Overall Tour of Chongming Island
 8th RideLondon Classique

References

External links
 

1989 births
Living people
Italian female cyclists
Cyclists from the Province of Vicenza
Italian track cyclists